Shorea inaequilateralis (called, along with some other species in the genus Shorea, red balau) is a species of tree in the family Dipterocarpaceae. It is endemic to Borneo. It is threatened by habitat loss.

References

inaequilateralis
Endemic flora of Borneo
Trees of Borneo
Taxonomy articles created by Polbot